Marco Marcola (1740–1793) was an Italian painter, born and mainly active in Verona. He was initially apprenticed to his father Giovanni Battista Marcola. Among his pupils were Antonio Pachera, Bellino Bellini, and Domenico Zanconti. He is also known as Marco Marcuola. His sister Angela Marcola was also a painter.

Sources

1740 births
1793 deaths
Painters from Verona
18th-century Italian painters
Italian male painters
18th-century Italian male artists